Bosnia and Herzegovina competed at the 2022 World Games held in Birmingham, United States from 7 to 17 July 2022. Athletes representing Bosnia and Herzegovina won one silver medal and the country finished in 63rd place in the medal table.

Medalists

Competitors
The following is the list of number of competitors in the Games:

Cue sports

Bosnia and Herzegovina won one silver medal in cue sports.

Kickboxing

Bosnia and Herzegovina competed in kickboxing.

References

Nations at the 2022 World Games
2022
World Games